The Boston mayoral election of 1983 occurred on Tuesday, November 15, 1983, between City Councillor Raymond Flynn and former State Representative Mel King. Flynn was elected to his first term, and inaugurated on Monday, January 2, 1984.

The nonpartisan municipal preliminary election was held on Tuesday, October 11, 1983.

King's victory in the preliminary election made him the first African-American to be a finalist for mayor in city history.

Campaign
On March 5, 1983, former State Representative Mel King became the first candidate to officially enter the race. The focus of his campaign was decentralizing the city's government and bringing together its racially polarized population. His announcement came on the 213th anniversary of the death of Crispus Attucks during the Boston Massacre.

On March 15, former Deputy Mayor and Massachusetts Bay Transportation Authority general manager Bob Kiley became the second candidate to enter the race. On March 20, Mayor Kevin White told WCVB-TV's Frank Avruch that he planned on running for an unprecedented fifth term. However, soon after the announcement, aides to the Mayor retracted his statement, saying that it was "facetious" and "jocular".

On April 19, City Councillor Frederick C. Langone declared his candidacy. Langone was accused of running as a publicity stunt, a charge the Councillor denied. To prove that his campaign was serious he announced that he would not seek another City Council term. On April 24, Suffolk County Sheriff Dennis J. Kearney declared his candidacy at Faneuil Hall. He promised that if elected he would create an office of internal affairs to investigate "fraud, waste and abuse". He also promised to hire 99 new police officers each year for the next three years, a plan which would cost the city $3 million.

Former School Board President and radio talk show host David Finnegan announced his candidacy on April 21 at the Strand Theatre in Uphams Corner. Finnegan chose to make his announcement in Uphams Corner because White had not fulfilled his promise to rebuild the neighborhood and the man he appointed to run the project was jail. He attempted to portray himself as the best candidate to defeat Mayor White and used the campaign slogan "Finnegan or him again." After White announced that he was not running, Finnegan changed the slogan to "Begin Again with Finnegan".

On April 26, Lawrence DiCara, David Finnegan, Ray Flynn, Dennis Kearney, Bob Kiley, Mel King, Frederick Langone, and Eloise Linger participated in the first mayoral debate. On April 27, City Councillor Ray Flynn announced his candidacy. As part of his announcement he released "The Flynn Program for Boston", a 30-page booklet outlining his proposals for jobs, housing, crime, services, and other issues.

On May 6, LaRouche movement member Michael Gelber announced that he was entering the race. On May 26, Mayor White announced that he would not seek a fifth term.

The first televised debate of the campaign was held on June 29. All nine candidates participated. The League of Women Voters of Boston and the Boston Chamber of Commerce hosted another debate between Kiley, Flynn, Langone, Kearney, Finnegan, and DiCara at Faneuil Hall. Gelber and Linger were excluded from the debate and King chose not to participate in protest of the decision to exclude two of the candidates.

Shortly before the preliminary election, Bob Kiley withdrew from the race and endorsed DiCara. Two weeks before the preliminary election, a poll by The Boston Globe showed that King was in a dead heat with Finnegan and Flynn. King's campaign gained momentum through a voter registration drive and visits from Chicago Mayor Harold Washington and Atlanta Mayor Andrew Young.

Although he had the most campaign funds and was considered to be a favorite to make the runoff election, Finnegan was criticized for running a "safe" campaign and for "lack[ing] substance". On October 11, Flynn and King received the most votes in the preliminary election and moved on to the general election. Both Flynn and King were considered to be on the liberal wing of the Democratic Party. Flynn went on to win the general election, 65%–35%.

Candidates
Raymond Flynn, Member of the Boston City Council since 1978 and state representative from 1971 to 1979.
Mel King, Member of the Massachusetts House of Representatives from 1973 to 1983.

Candidates eliminated in preliminary election
Lawrence DiCara, member of the Boston City Council from 1972 to 1981, Council President in 1978.
David Finnegan, president of the Boston School Committee from 1975 to 1979 and a radio/television talk show host.
Michael Gelber, member of the LaRouche movement.
Dennis J. Kearney, Sheriff of Suffolk County since 1981.
Bob Kiley (dropped out), Deputy Mayor from 1972 to 1975 and general manager of the Massachusetts Bay Transportation Authority from 1975 to 1979.
Frederick C. Langone, member Boston City Council in 1961, and from 1964 to 1983.
Eloise Linger, member of the Socialist Workers Party.

Results

See also
List of mayors of Boston, Massachusetts

References

Mayoral election
Boston mayoral
Boston
Mayoral elections in Boston
Non-partisan elections